Felipe Drugovich Roncato (born 23 May 2000) is a Brazilian racing driver who last competed in the FIA Formula 2 Championship with MP Motorsport. He is the 2018 Euroformula Open champion and the 2022 Formula 2 champion, as well as the current test and reserve driver for Aston Martin and McLaren in Formula 1.

Junior career

Karting 
Born in Maringá, Drugovich competed in numerous karting championships across Brazil and Europe, taking major championship victories.

Lower formulae

ADAC Formula 4 
Drugovich made his single-seaters debut in 2016, joining Neuhauser Racing in ADAC Formula 4. He achieved his first and only podium of the season in third place at the Zandvoort round. He ended the season finished fourth in the rookie standings and twelfth overall, with 79.5 points. The following season, Drugovich switched to Van Amersfoort Racing, and also made his debut in Italian F4 with the team. Drugovich claimed seven wins — the most of any driver throughout the season. Ultimately, he finished 3rd in the standings with 236.5 points, missing out by nine points to champion Jüri Vips as a technical issue in the final round at the Hockenheimring potentially costing Drugovich the title.

MRF Challenge 
Drugovich also competed in the MRF Challenge, claiming his maiden single-seater victory in the second race of round two and finishing fourth overall. The following year, Drugovich won the title by taking 10 wins out of the 16 races held that season with two races left.

FIA Formula 3 European Championship 
Drugovich stepped up to the FIA Formula 3 European Championship with Van Amersfoort Racing for the 2017 season finale at the Hockenheimring.

Euroformula Open 

Drugovich made his debut in the final round of the 2017 season as a guest driver with RP Motorsport, scoring a pole. Despite a mistake in the first race, Drugovich managed to take his first Euroformula Open win in the second. The following year, Drugovich reunited with RP to contest the championship full-time. He proceeded to dominate the championship finishing on the podium at all races, claiming a record fourteen wins and taking the title at Monza with two rounds to spare. In an article by Motorsport.com, Drugovich was ranked 18th in the top 20 junior single-seater drivers of 2018.

Pro Mazda 
Following the injuries sustained by Harrison Scott in Toronto, Drugovich was drafted in by RP to replace him for the 2018 Pro Mazda round at Mid-Ohio.

GP3 Series 
In November 2018, Drugovich partook in the post-season test at Yas Marina with ART Grand Prix. He would go to set the 11th and 17th fastest times on Day 1 and Day 2 respectively.

FIA Formula 3 Championship 

In February 2019, Carlin Buzz Racing confirmed that Drugovich would race with them in the inaugural championship, alongside Logan Sargeant and Teppei Natori. His season would be tough, scoring his only points with sixth place in race one of the Hungary round. He was set for another points finish in race two, but suffered a puncture after contact with Robert Shwartzman while battling over third place, both ultimately retiring from the race. He scored eight points and finished the season in 16th place, also scoring more points than both of his teammates combined.

FIA Formula 2 Championship

2020 
After testing with them in post-season testing at Yas Marina, Drugovich was signed to MP Motorsport for the 2020 season, partnering Nobuharu Matsushita. The season was set to start in March, but was delayed due to the COVID-19 pandemic. Drugovich impressed in his debut round of Formula 2 at the Red Bull Ring, qualifying 2nd behind Guanyu Zhou at the Red Bull Ring. Drugovich dropped to fourth on the opening lap, being overtaken by Callum Ilott and Mick Schumacher. He could not keep his pace up, eventually finishing 8th. However, his result gave him reverse pole for the feature race. He stayed clear of the pack, eventually winning the race, leading every lap. In an interview after the race, the Brazilian commented that "it was certainly not [comfortable] and it was really hard" due to three safety car restarts during the race. Drugovich had a poor weekend in the second Red Bull Ring round, qualifying 10th and finishing 13th in both the feature and sprint races.

Drugovich qualified in 18th at Hungaroring for the feature race. He attempted a tire strategy different from the front-runners. Drugovich had better tyre management and rapidly climbed up the order, eventually finishing fifth. During the sprint race, he had a shocking start falling towards the back on the opening lap. He could not recover, and finished the race in 16th. Drugovich recorded his maiden pole position at the next race in Silverstone beating out Ilott. He described his pole as "amazing" and "perfect".  He was unable to convert it to a victory, slipping to seventh place. Drugovich lined up second for the sprint race, but was passed by Christian Lundgaard and Louis Delétraz on the first lap, eventually ending up in sixth. In the second Silverstone weekend, Drugovich only managed to claim a point, by finishing tenth in the feature race from twelfth on the grid. Drugovich qualified fourth but fell to fifth after being passed by Schumacher at the start of the Barcelona feature race. On lap 24, following a good pit stop strategy, Drugovich passed Robert Shwartzman for the net second place, but a lap later Giuliano Alesi brought out the safety car which would change the race. Drugovich pitted for fresher tyres, but was unable to recover the positions lost. He eventually finished seventh. He had better fortunes in the sprint race. Starting second, he had a better start to pass Luca Ghiotto before turn 1. His pace was dominant, winning by 9.5 seconds. Drugovich then stated that the victory "makes up for missed opportunity" in the feature race.

Drugovich qualified fifth at Spa-Francorchamps, but would turn out to have a tough weekend there. On lap 4, while battling for seventh place, Drugovich collided with teammate Matsushita, the Japanese driver slamming into the barrier and retiring on the spot. Drugovich meanwhile, damaged his front wing in the incident. He eventually finished the race in 20th, albeit last. However, after the race, Drugovich was disqualified for pitting on the last lap which violated the rules. He finished the sprint in 13th. Another poor weekend in Monza followed. He finished 16th after a poor start in the feature race and retired in the sprint race, after Roy Nissany hit him at the back while running just outside the top ten. Drugovich had a solid weekend at Mugello improving a place on the first lap of the feature race after qualifying 5th. When Alesi brought out the safety car, Drugovich pitted for fresher tyres that left him down in 13th. However, he managed to fight back to fight to third on lap 31. Unfortunately, on the last lap, Delétraz snatched away the podium place from him, and so Drugovich was classified fourth. Drugovich was comfortably running in the top 8 for most of the sprint race, however he encountered a car issue. He was quickly overtaken during the later stages and finished 15th.

Drugovich had another point-less weekend in Sochi. He was hit from behind on lap 1 in the feature race, and with too much damage sustained, was unable to continue. His sprint race would be just as horrible, finishing last in a red-flagged sprint race after Drugovich had problems with pedal shifts in his steering wheel. Drugovich qualified second for the first Bahrain round, but passed polesitter Callum Ilott into the first corner. Despite being undercut by Ilott during the pit stops, Drugovich managed to pass him again on lap 20. He would therefore go on to win his first feature race by a dominant 14 seconds describing his win as "surprising". He started eighth for the sprint race, which was where he finished. For the second Bahrain round, Drugovich qualified fifth and would be in a battle for the lead for most part of the feature race. Eventually, he finished fourth. However, Nikita Mazepin was penalised for track limits while defending against Yuki Tsunoda and Drugovich, which promoted the Brazilian driver to third. Drugovich capped off the season with a point in eighth at the sprint race. Overall, Drugovich finished his maiden campaign in 9th with 121 points. He achieved a total of three wins, a pole and a fastest lap each, and four podiums.

2021 

Drugovich joined Virtuosi Racing in 2021, alongside Chinese driver Guanyu Zhou.

Drugovich topped free practice for the opening race at the Bahrain International Circuit. He would follow it up with an impressive third place in qualifying. For the first sprint race, Drugovich initially ran in the top ten for the first two laps until he was forced to pit due to front wing damage. He finished in 16th. Drugovich made up nine positions to fifth during the opening four laps of the second sprint. Unfortunately, a late safety car brought out by Liam Lawson thwarted his efforts though, as drivers on new tyres passed him and dropped Drugovich down to 14th. In the feature race, Drugovich made up a place on teammate Zhou on the first lap but was back down in third after Oscar Piastri overtook him. After a safety car restart, Drugovich slowly dropped and finished in 8th, but was demoted a place due to a safety car infringement. Drugovich qualified ninth at Monaco but he would start second for the first sprint. He was passed by Christian Lundgaard at the start of the race but halfway through the race, he was back in second as the Danish driver retired with an engine problem. Drugovich would then go on to finish in that position, while taking his first podium of the season. For the second sprint race, on lap 11, a virtual safety car was deployed and Drugovich along with Zhou, made a gamble to put on slick tyres during mixed conditions. It did not pay off, and just a few laps later Drugovich pitted back for wet tyres. He would finish in 14th position. During the feature race, Drugovich pitted early on lap 10 attempting an alternative strategy. This would be a successful strategy and following mishaps from Robert Shwartzman and Dan Ticktum, he was up to third place and would end in that position. Over the radio, he declared that "it was the best race of [his] life".

Drugovich qualified eleventh for the race at Baku. On the opening lap of the first sprint, Drugovich thumped Piastri, who in turn put Lawson in the wall. The stewards deemed Drugovich responsible of the incident, and he was handed a ten-second time penalty. He originally finished ninth but was demoted to 14th. Drugovich made up positions to seventh before the safety car was called out. He slowly was overtaken by quicker drivers and eventually finished tenth. Drugovich made up four positions to seventh on the opening lap, thanks to an incident. He made a comeback drive, overtaking Ralph Boschung during the later stages to finish fourth. Drugovich qualified sixth for the Silverstone weekend. He made up a place on a retirement from Roy Nissany on the opening lap of the first sprint. The rest of his race would be quiet and he would finish in fourth. He finished sixth in the second sprint after pressuring Jüri Vips in the closing stages. In the feature race, Drugovich finished in sixth, the same place where started after passing Théo Pourchaire at the start but eventually being undercut by Shwartzman.

Drugovich qualified fifth at Monza, but would turn out to have a poor weekend. Making up a place on Boschung on the opening lap of the first sprint, he clipped Ticktum and spun him out of the race. Drugovich then pitted for a new nose and dropped to 19th. It was not to last however, as on lap 5 he spun out of the race at the Ascari corner. Drugovich only made up three places during the second sprint to finish in 17th. During the feature race, he was running in a net sixth place when he was told to pit once again on lap 15, due to a confusion on front wing damage. He would complete the race in 12th, ending the weekend without points. Drugovich set the fastest time during practice at Sochi, and qualified 13th. However, on the way to the starting grid for the sprint, he crashed heavily into the wall and was taken to hospital. Thankfully, he emerged unscathed but was declared not fit to take part in the feature race.

Drugovich qualified fifth at the Jeddah Corniche Circuit. Starting sixth for the first sprint, he concluded the race in fourth after an opening lap pass on Pourchaire and passing Boschung later. Drugovich looked like he was going to finish in the top ten of sprint race 2, but he sustained damaged after Jüri Vips tagged him from behind, dropping Drugovich to tenth at the flag with multiple penalties from other drivers applied. Drugovich finished the red-flagged feature race in fifth. At the final round at Yas Marina, Drugovich qualified eighth. He made a good start on the first sprint, to pass Ticktum and improve to second on the opening lap. Drugovich pressurised Daruvala for most of the race; nearly taking the lead on lap 12, but as the race end drew closer, his challenge faded and Daruvala eventually won. Drugovich finished fifth in the second sprint, nearly overtaking Ticktum on the last lap. In the feature race, Drugovich along with Pourchaire went on the alternative strategy by pitting later in the race. A slightly slow stop for Pourchaire saw Drugovich make a timely overtake on him just before the virtual safety car was called out. On the penultimate lap, Drugovich passed Shwartzman for third and seal off the season with another podium. His clean performance in Abu Dhabi saw him jump Liam Lawson to eighth in the standings, with 105 points and help UNI-Virtuosi leapfrog Carlin as vice-champions. Compared to teammate Zhou, his season was rather frustrating taking four podiums but no wins.

2022 

Drugovich re-joined MP Motorsport for 2022, this time partnering FIA Formula 3 graduate Clément Novalak. Upon his return to the Dutch outfit, Drugovich stated that he "felt like home".

Drugovich set the fastest time of pre-season testing at the Bahrain International Circuit. He would follow it up by topping practice of the first round in Bahrain. However he only qualified tenth but despite that, he would start on reverse pole for the sprint race. He had a shocking start, falling to sixth. He soon overtook Jake Hughes on the third lap to move up and finish fifth. Drugovich fell to 15th at the start of the feature race, and pitted early for softer tyres. He was soon promoted to second place behind Ayumu Iwasa who was yet to pit, but on lap 17 was overtaken by Théo Pourchaire. Drugovich was overtaken by a few more drivers on fresher tyres and he eventually finished sixth. Drugovich took his second pole position in the series and first of the season at Jeddah, having topped practice as well. Drugovich improved up the order in the sprint race to finish fourth on the road, but was promoted to third after Hughes was disqualified. Drugovich dominated the feature race winning by two seconds despite Richard Verschoor catching up to him during the last few laps. This allowed him to take the championship lead for the first time ever, leading by 11 points, and stated that he had "all the confidence [I] want".

Drugovich qualified a lowly 12th in Imola. However in the sprint race, he made a quick start, passing five cars to take seventh on the opening lap. He then passed Ralph Boschung retiring and then on the final lap, passed Logan Sargeant to take fifth. Drugovich attempted a strategy by starting on the hards. Unfortunately, a safety car on lap 8 rather ruined it, and Drugovich was unable to pull away quickly from the other runners. Drugovich managed to pit under the safety car right at the end, and rescued a point finishing in 10th. However, since Pourchaire won the feature race, Drugovich lost the championship lead and fell to second place, trailing the Frenchman by two points. In Barcelona, having topped practice yet again, he qualified in tenth place. He was set to start in pole position for the sprint race, but was penalised three places for impeding another driver. With reverse polesitter Calan Williams stalling, Drugovich stormed from third to first into the first corner, and led lights-to-flag for his second win of the year. In the feature race, Drugovich did a lengthy stint on his soft tyres, reaching half-race distance before pitting. Following that, he quickly overtook second-placed Frederik Vesti. On lap 27, he passed race leader Jack Doohan and eventually won by five seconds. In doing so, Drugovich became the first F2 driver to win all races in an F2 weekend, which according to him "really showed [their] potential". With that result, Drugovich moved back into the championship lead by 26 points.

In Monaco, despite crashing, Drugovich qualified on pole after previous polesitter Liam Lawson was penalised for disobeying yellow flag conditions. In the sprint race, he suffered a puncture on the opening lap and after pitting a few times he retired for good on lap 20. In the feature race, Drugovich had a slow pit stop but since second-placed Pourchaire's pit stop was equally slow, Drugovich managed to exit ahead of the Frenchman. For the rest of the race, Pourchaire pressured Drugovich within a second but to no avail, and Drugovich was able to take his fourth win of the season. In Baku, he qualified fifth. He finished in fifth during a chaotic sprint race, having dropped two positions at the start. In the feature race, having sat in fifth until the lap 15 safety car restart when Marcus Armstrong ahead suffered front wing damage which promoted Drugovich to fourth. A late crash for leader Jüri Vips meant Drugovich was able to inherit a position and take third place. His result meant he moved 51 points clear of second-placed Pourchaire.

In Silverstone, Drugovich qualified third coincidentally setting the same lap as Pourchaire but the former was given position ahead having ended his lap earlier. For the sprint race, he made a few overtakes to take fifth place. For the feature race, a slow start saw him drop back to fifth. His race was relatively quiet until the final lap, where he passed Frederik Vesti to snatch fourth place. At the Red Bull Ring he managed fifth in qualifying, and fourth in the sprint race. However the choice to start on wet tyres on a drying track during the feature race did not pay off, and was second last before he made his pit stop. He was unable to progress much and despite a few penalties for others, he finished 11th overall in the race. Following Austria, Drugovich's lead was cut to 39 points.

In France, he qualified second, but his lap time was deleted and his next-best lap time was used, dropping him to sixth. In the sprint race, Drugovich capitalised on Pourchaire forcing Armstrong wide late in the race, which saw him take fourth place, but was promoted to the podium after Pourchaire was penalised. In the feature race, he fell to eighth in the early stages but was back up to fifth following the pit stops. He secured fourth place after making a late overtake on Doohan with four laps to go. In Budapest, he qualified third. Having finished fourth in the sprint race, Drugovich had a much tougher feature race. He was jumped by Pourchaire at the start, and decided to pit early. Drugovich made an undercut on Armstrong but the New Zealander would repass him on lap 19. With degrading tyres, Drugovich was passed by cars on fresher tyres which dropped him to ninth at the flag. By Pourchaire winning at the same time, Drugovich's lead was slashed to 21 points heading into the summer break.

In Spa-Francorchamps, Drugovich took his third pole of the year. In the sprint race, he moved into sixth at the start, remaining there until Sargeant brought out the safety car while Drugovich opted to pit for fresher tyres. Rejoining in 12th, he made up eight positions to claim fourth place in only four laps. In the feature race, he ended in second place after eventual winner Doohan made  a successful undercut during the pit stops, leaving Drugovich coming up short by two seconds. In Zandvoort, he took consecutive poles for the first time, stating that his flying laps up until his pole lap "didn't have full confidence". Having finished tenth in the sprint race, Drugovich returned to winning ways in the feature race, which gave him one hand on the championship title. With Pourchaire only scoring two points in the two rounds, Drugovich extended his lead over him to 69 points.

Heading into Monza, Drugovich qualified fourth, but was penalised five places to 12th for the sprint race for breaching yellow flags. He would seal the title in the sprint race if Pourchaire finished sixth or lower. Drugovich retired early on the last lap after making contact with Amaury Cordeel, damaging his suspension. With Pourchaire finishing only 17th, it meant that Drugovich was crowned 2022 Formula 2 champion. Following the race, Drugovich described his title as "not how [I] expected it". In the feature race, Drugovich ran third before a lap 7 safety car, which he pitted two laps later and came out down in 13th place. He had little pace, passing Cordeel late in the race to take seventh, later a post-race disqualification promoted Drugovich to sixth place. Drugovich qualified fourth for the Yas Marina season finale. In the sprint race, he snatched third place from Amaury Cordeel on the third last lap, adding another podium to his tally. In the feature race, Drugovich took Pourchaire at the start into third, and later moved into second by passing Roy Nissany. He battled Iwasa during the last laps but settled for second place. Drugovich ended the year as champion with 265 points, 101 ahead of nearest rival Pourchaire and claimed five wins, four poles and eleven podiums.

Formula One 
On 12 September 2022, two days after winning the 2022 Formula 2 Championship, Drugovich was announced as the first member of the newly formed AMF1 Driver Development Programme, as well as joining Aston Martin's reserve driver roster. He had his first contact with a Formula One car testing the AMR21 at Silverstone at the beginning of November, thanks to which he met the necessary requirements to obtain the FIA Super Licence and drive in free practice at the 2022 Abu Dhabi Grand Prix. Drugovich also took part in the post-season tests in Abu Dhabi, driving the Aston Martin.

Drugovich, along with fellow Aston Martin reserve Stoffel Vandoorne, was also added to the pool of reserve drivers for McLaren for the first 15 races of the 2023 season. Drugovich drove the Aston Martin AMR23 during the first session of pre-season testing at Bahrain, after regular driver Lance Stroll suffered an injury in a bike accident. Shortly after leaving the pits for the first time, Drugovich had to stop his car on track at turn 4 due to an electrical fault, bringing out the red flags. He returned to the car in the morning session of the final day, and completed a combined total of 117 laps.

Other racing 
Drugovich was chosen to race in the 2023 Race of Champions in Sweden. He was paired up with Thierry Neuville in the ROC Nations Cup, competing for the All-Star team. The pair defeated Team USA and Team Germany, before losing to Team Norway in the final.

Personal life 
Drugovich was born in Maringá, Paraná, Brazil. He has Austrian and Italian ancestry, as well as having dual Brazilian and Italian citizenship.

His maternal uncles Sérgio Drugovich and Oswaldo Drugovich Jr. are also racing drivers.

Karting record

Karting career summary

Racing record

Racing career summary 

† As Drugovich was a guest driver, he was ineligible for points.
* Season still in progress.

Complete ADAC Formula 4 Championship results 
(key) (Races in bold indicate pole position) (Races in italics indicate fastest lap)

Complete MRF Challenge Formula 2000 Championship results 
(key) (Races in bold indicate pole position; races in italics indicate fastest lap)

Complete Italian F4 Championship results 
(key) (Races in bold indicate pole position) (Races in italics indicate fastest lap)

† Drugovich did not compete in the required number of rounds to be eligible for a championship position.

Complete FIA Formula 3 European Championship results 
(key) (Races in bold indicate pole position) (Races in italics indicate fastest lap)

† As Drugovich was a guest driver, he was ineligible for points.

Complete Euroformula Open Championship results 
(key) (Races in bold indicate pole position) (Races in italics indicate fastest lap)

† As Drugovich was a guest driver, he was ineligible for points.

Complete FIA Formula 3 Championship results 
(key) (Races in bold indicate pole position; races in italics indicate points for the fastest lap of top ten finishers)

Complete Macau Grand Prix results

Complete FIA Formula 2 Championship results 
(key) (Races in bold indicate pole position) (Races in italics indicate points for the fastest lap of top ten finishers)

‡ Half points awarded as less than 75% of race distance was completed.

Complete Formula One participations 
(key) (Races in bold indicate pole position) (Races in italics indicate fastest lap)

Complete Stock Car Brasil results 
(key) (Races in bold indicate pole position) (Races in italics indicate fastest lap)

† As Drugovich was a guest driver, he was ineligible for points.

American open-wheel racing results

Pro Mazda Championship

References

External links
 
 

2000 births
Living people
Brazilian racing drivers
Brazilian people of Austrian descent
Brazilian people of Italian descent
Italian F4 Championship drivers
ADAC Formula 4 drivers
MRF Challenge Formula 2000 Championship drivers
Euroformula Open Championship drivers
Indy Pro 2000 Championship drivers
FIA Formula 3 Championship drivers
FIA Formula 2 Championship drivers
Neuhauser Racing drivers
Van Amersfoort Racing drivers
RP Motorsport drivers
Carlin racing drivers
MP Motorsport drivers
Virtuosi Racing drivers
FIA Formula 2 Champions
People from Maringá
Stock Car Brasil drivers
Sportspeople from Paraná (state)
Karting World Championship drivers